Deadline is a 1988 British drama television film, directed by Richard Stroud and based on a novel and adapted for the screen by Tom Stacey, which aired on BBC. It stars John Hurt.

Plot
An alcoholic Fleet Street journalist is caught up in a coup on an island in the Persian Gulf, where the Emir's son and an enforcer attempt to depose his father.

Cast
John Hurt as Granville Jones
Imogen Stubbs as Lady Romy Burton
Robert McBain as Sandy McCulloch
Greg Hicks as Lou Rivers
Bargach Abdelrahim as Abdullah
Julian Curry as Stuart-Smith
David Conville as Sir Geoffrey Burton
Roshan Seth as The Emir of Hawa

References

External links 

1988 drama films
1988 films
Films about coups d'état
Films about journalists
Films set in the Middle East
Films set on islands
1980s British films
British drama television films